Robert "Bob" Faulkner (born in 1958) is a visually impaired Australian Paralympic athlete from Queensland who competed in athletics, goalball and swimming.

At the 1976 Toronto Games, he competed in three athletics events (pentathlon, long jump, 100m) and won a silver medal in the Men's 100m sprint division B. At the same Games, he competed in the Men's 100 m Backstroke division B. The next and final Paralympic Games which Faulkner competed at were in 1980 in Arnhem, Netherlands. Faulkner competed in 4 athletics events at these Games however, was unable to place in any of them. The events he competed in at these Games included; 100m race, pentathlon, high jump and triple jump. At the same Games, Faulkner also competed in goalball alongside his 3 other teammates; David Manera, Robert McIntyre and Bruce Sandilands. The Australian team did not medal at these Games.

Robert also competed at the 1976 Arnhem Games in athletics and goalball. Robert now lives in Brisbane, Australia where he is a father to two children and works as a sport and recreation officer.

References 

Living people
1958 births
Paralympic athletes of Australia
Male Paralympic swimmers of Australia
Athletes (track and field) at the 1976 Summer Paralympics
Swimmers at the 1976 Summer Paralympics
Paralympic silver medalists for Australia
Visually impaired sprinters
Visually impaired high jumpers
Visually impaired triple jumpers
Visually impaired long jumpers
Australian blind people
Medalists at the 1976 Summer Paralympics
Paralympic medalists in athletics (track and field)
Australian male sprinters
Australian pentathletes
Australian male long jumpers
Australian male high jumpers
Australian male triple jumpers
Australian male backstroke swimmers